The Lahore Museum ("Lahore Wonder House") is a museum located in Lahore, Pakistan. Founded in 1865 at a smaller location and opened in 1894 at its current location on The Mall in Lahore during the British colonial period, Lahore Museum is Pakistan's largest museum, as well as one of its most visited ones. 

The museum houses an extensive collection of Buddhist art from the ancient Indo-Greek and Gandhara kingdoms. It also has collections from the Mughal Empire, Sikh Empire and the British Empire in India.

The Lahore Museum, along with the Zamzama Gun located directly in front of the building, is the setting of the opening scene in the novel Kim by Rudyard Kipling, whose father, John Lockwood Kipling, was one of the museum's earliest curators.

History

Lahore Museum was originally established in 1865–66 on the site of the current Tollinton Market – a hall built for the 1864 Punjab Exhibition. The present building was constructed as a memorial of Golden Jubilee of Queen Victoria held in 1887, and financed through a special public fund raised on the occasion. The foundation stone of the new museum was laid on 3 February 1890 by Prince Albert Victor, Duke of Clarence and Queen Victoria's grandson.  On its completion in 1894, the entire museum collection was transferred to present building with its new name as Jubilee Museum.

The museum's collection was later shifted in 1894 to its present location on The Mall, in Lahore's British-era core. The present building was designed by the well-known architect from Lahore, Sir Ganga Ram.

Rudyard Kipling’s father, John Lockwood Kipling, was one of the museum's first curators, and was succeeded by K. N. Sitaram.

In 1948, as part of the partition of Punjab, the artefacts of the museum were divided between the newly formed countries of Pakistan and India, with the museum retaining about 60% of its collection. The rest was given to India and eventually housed at the Government Museum and Art Gallery in Chandigarh, built specifically for this purpose.

The museum's golden years are considered to be from 1970 to 1990, when scholar, archaeologist, and museologist Dr Saif-ur-Rehman Dar served as its director. He wrote several books about the museum, and his tenure was complemented by that of B.A. Qureshi, who was the chairman of the museum's board of governors back then.

After that, the condition of the museum went deteriorated due to the lack of support for its restoration.

Over 250,000 visitors were registered at the Lahore Museum in 2005. This dropped to 236,536 in 2016, 214,697 in 2017, but rose to 227,994 in 2018. It was the most popular museum of Pakistan among foreigners in 2016 (2,956 visits) and 2017 (2,941 visits). It dropped to second place (with 3,659 foreign visitors) in 2018, having been replaced by Taxila Museum.

Scope 
The museum displays archaeological materials from Bronze Age (Indus Valley civilization) to the medieval era Hindu Shahi period. It has one of the largest collections of archaeology, history, arts, fine arts, applied arts, ethnology, and craft objects in Pakistan. It also has an extensive collection of Hellenistic and Mughal coins. There is also a photo gallery dedicated to the emergence of Pakistan as an independent state, the Pakistan Movement Gallery.

Collections
The museum has a number of Greco-Buddhist sculptures, Mughal and Pahari paintings on display. Over 58,000 artifacts are reported to be part of its collection, with only 14,000 being on display. The collection contains important relics from the Indus Valley civilization, Gandhara, and Graeco-Bactrian periods as well. The Fasting Buddha, dating from the Gandhara period, is one of the museums most prized and celebrated objects.

The coin collection consists of 38,000 rare coins.

The Evolution of Mankind 
The ceiling of the entrance hall features The Evolution of Mankind, a large mural consisting of 48 panels (each measuring 6 by 8 feet). It was painted by Pakistani artist Sadequain who originally completed it in 1973. Due to the weather conditions and termite attacks, the mural suffered significant damage over the years, A grant was approved by the Governor of Punjab in 2008 to start the restoration work. It was taken down in 2010, while restoration work began in 2012. By 2018, 16 of the panels had been restored by Uzma Usmani and Mumtaz Hussain.

The museum also contains fine specimens of Mughal and Sikh carved woodwork and has a large collection of paintings dating back to the British period. The collection also includes musical instruments, ancient jewelry, textiles, pottery, and armory, as well as some Tibetan and Nepalese work on display.

Directors 
The following is a list of the museum's directors.

Book
The book Masterpieces of Lahore Museum, written by Anjum Rehmani, was published by the museum in 1999 with financial assistance from UNESCO. A new edition was published in 2006.

In popular culture
Rudyard Kipling's novel, Kim (published in 1901), was set in the vicinity of the old/original Lahore Museum and the Mall areas.

Further reading

See also
List of museums in Pakistan
 Lahore: History and Architecture of Mughal Monuments

References

External links

 Official website
 Official Facebook page
 Official Twitter page
 Lahore Museum  at Google Cultural Institute

Museums in Punjab, Pakistan
Decorative arts museums
Buildings and structures in Lahore
Culture in Lahore
Tourist attractions in Lahore
Museums established in 1865
1865 establishments in British India
British colonial architecture
British colonial architecture in India
The Mall, Lahore